The Beneteau Wizz is a two-man dinghy built in 1982. It was elected as boat of the year in that same year.

Performance and design
The Wizz has a simple design, created with stability and surfing in mind. It is quick and easy to rig, and can be fitted to a car roof rack. Despite being a short boat, at just , the Wizz weighs  and accommodates for two crew.

References

External links
www.beneteau-wizz.net (French)
Details at www.noblemarine.co.uk

Sailboat types built by Beneteau
Sailboat types built in France
1980s sailboat type designs
Dinghies
Beneteau